XEHR-AM is a radio station on 1090 AM in Puebla, Puebla, Mexico. It is owned by Cinco Radio and carries a talk format known as La HR.

History

XEHR was the first radio station in Puebla. It received its concession on September 12, 1939 and was owned by Manuel R. Canales until 1965.

References

Mass media in Puebla (city)
Radio stations in Puebla
Radio stations established in 1939
1939 establishments in Mexico